Scopula sinopersonata is a moth of the family Geometridae. It is found in China.

References

Moths described in 1932
Taxa named by Louis Beethoven Prout
sinopersonata
Moths of Asia